Les Carter may refer to:

 Les Carter (musician), member of the group Carter the Unstoppable Sex Machine
 Les Carter (footballer) (born 1960), English former footballer

See also
Leslie Carter (disambiguation)